The  thick-billed flowerpecker  (Dicaeum agile) is a tiny bird in the flowerpecker group. They feed predominantly on fruits and are active birds that are mainly seen in the tops of trees in forests. It is a resident bird with a wide distribution across tropical southern Asia from India east to Indonesia and Timor with several populations recognized as subspecies some of which are sometimes treated as full species.

Description

This species flowerpecker is about 10 cm long and has a dark stout beak and short tail. They are dark grey brown above and dull greyish with diffuse streaking on light buffy underparts. The rump is slightly more olive in the nominate race. The bill is dark, somewhat stout and heavy and the iris is reddish. The sexes are not distinguishable in the field and the juvenile has a paler base to the mandible and less streaks on the underside. There are whitish spots at the tip of the tail feathers. The nominate race is found on the plains of the mainland of the Indian Subcontinent. The Sri Lankan population, zeylonense (=zeylonicum, zeylonica), is smaller and darker above. and Subspecies modestum (including pallescens) is found in northeastern India and extends into Burma. Several island forms have been described but some of them are only tentatively kept within this species. These include atjehense of Sumatra, finschi of western Java, tinctum of Sumba, Flores and Alor, obsoletum from Timor, striatissimum, aeruginosum and affine from the Philippines. Several of these such as aeruginosum are considered as full species as they are reproductively isolated and distinct in morphology.

Behaviour and ecology
Like other flowerpeckers they feed mainly on berries, nectar but sometimes take insects. Many of the subspecies are found in dense lowland forests with the exception of the nominate race which is found mainly in cultivated areas or open forest.

Unlike the pale-billed flowerpecker, it does not swallow the berries of Loranthus (some species now in genus Dendrophthoe) and instead wipes the seeds on a branch and feeds on the epicarp. This makes it disperse the parasitic mistletoe locally unlike the other species. In Sri Lanka, they forage at a greater height in the canopy than the pale-billed flowerpecker.

Foraging birds produce a spick call frequently and the tail is jerked from side to side when perched. When displaying the male twitters and flutters over the female. The song is rambling and is mixed with notes that resemble that of the ashy prinia. The feathers of the crown are erected in display and the white bases of the feathers become visible as a crown stripe.

The nest has been described as appearing camouflaged like a dry leaf. It is a pendant purse like structure made of cobwebs or fine plant fibres and is located from 3 to 15 metres high suspended from a thin horizontal branch. Said to frequently nest among the nests of Oecophylla smaragdina ants. The breeding season in southern India is December to March. Both male and female participate in nest building. The usual clutch is about 3 eggs but can vary from 2 to 4. The incubation period is around 13 days and the chick takes around 18 days to fledge.

Gallery

References

External links

 Photographs and videos
Image at ADW

thick-billed flowerpecker
Birds of South Asia
Birds of Southeast Asia
thick-billed flowerpecker